The following radio stations broadcast on FM frequency 93.9 MHz:

Antarctica
AFAN at McMurdo, Ross Dependency

Argentina
 LRS792 Urbana in Bahía Blanca, Buenos Aires
 Visión de Futuro in Rosario, Santa Fe

Australia
 Monaro FM in Jindabyne, New South Wales
 ABC Radio National in Tamworth, New South Wales
 2LFF in Young, New South Wales
 ABC Radio National in Cairns, Queensland
 ABC Radio National in Emerald, Queensland
 Riverland Life FM in Renmark, South Australia
 ABC Classic in Hobart, Tasmania
 3BAY in Geelong, Victoria
Love 93.9 in California (Later Love 94)

Canada (Channel 230)
 CBHF-FM in North-East Margaree, Nova Scotia
 CBMZ-FM in Trois-Rivieres, Quebec
 CBX-2-FM in Edmonton, Alberta
 CBXG-FM in Peace River, Alberta
 CFNE-FM in Waswanipi, Quebec
 CFWC-FM in Brantford, Ontario
 CHBW-FM-1 in Nordegg, Alberta
 CICK-FM in Smithers, British Columbia
 CIDR-FM in Windsor, Ontario
 CIEL-FM-1 in Riviere-du-Loup, Quebec
 CIEL-FM-4 in Trois-Pistoles, Quebec
 CIKI-FM-2 in Ste-Marguerite-Marie, Quebec
 CIRB-FM in Confederation Bridge, Prince Edward Island
 CJLU-FM in Dartmouth, Nova Scotia
 CKIZ-FM-1 in Enderby, British Columbia
 CKKL-FM in Ottawa, Ontario
 VF2144 in Lillooet, British Columbia
 VF2318 in Blue River, British Columbia
 VF2420 in Camperville, Manitoba
 VF2422 in Ilford, Manitoba
 VF2459 in Saskatoon, Saskatchewan
 VF2579 in Bloodvein, Manitoba

China 
 CNR Business Radio in Nanping

Indonesia
 Mersi FM 93.9 in Tangerang, Banten, Indonesia

Japan
 SBS Radio in Shizuoka

Malaysia
 Bernama Radio in Klang Valley

Mexico
XHEVZ-FM in Acayucan, Veracruz
XHHY-FM in Querétaro, Querétaro
XHIGA-FM in Iguala, Guerrero
XHLZ-FM in Lázaro Cárdenas, Michoacán
XHMO-FM in Morelia, Michoacán
XHMV-FM in Hermosillo, Sonora
XHMZS-FM in Mazatlán, Sinaloa
XHONT-FM in Frontera, Coahuila
XHPCHU-FM in Tapachula, Chiapas
XHPMEN-FM in Ciudad del Carmen, Campeche
XHRAW-FM in Ciudad Alemán, Tamaulipas
XHRPL-FM in León, Guanajuato
XHSC-FM in Zapopan, Jalisco
XHSFP-FM in San Felipe, Baja California
XHTEE-FM in Tehuacán, Puebla
XHTGU-FM in Tuxtla Gutiérrez, Chiapas
XHTXA-FM in Tuxpan, Veracruz
XHVD-FM in Ciudad Allende, Coahuila
XHWN-FM in Torreón, Coahuila
XHYP-FM in El Limón, Tamaulipas

Philippines
DWKC-FM in Manila
DYXL in Cebu City
DXXL in Davao City
DWRD in Legazpi City, Albay
DXCB in Zamboanga City

United States (Channel 230)
  in Gosnell, Arkansas
 KAVS-LP in Fallon, Nevada
  in Modesto, California
 KBNU in Uvalde, Texas
 KCWA in Loveland, Colorado
 KDMA-FM in Granite Falls, Minnesota
 KETO-LP in Aurora, Colorado
  in King City, California
 KFON in Groveton, Texas
 KGCG-LP in Blanchard, Oklahoma
 KGGM in Delhi, Louisiana
 KGKS in Scott City, Missouri
 KGMG-LP in Clovis, New Mexico
  in Mason City, Iowa
  in Watonga, Oklahoma
  in El Paso, Texas
  in Webb City, Missouri
  in Rapid City, South Dakota
 KKOP-LP in Clay Center, Nebraska
 KLLI in Los Angeles, California
  in Kailua Kona, Hawaii
  in Flagstaff, Arizona
  in Alexandria, Louisiana
  in Corpus Christi, Texas
 KOTE in Eureka, Kansas
 KOYN in Paris, Texas
 KPAY-FM in Chico, California
  in Portland, Oregon
  in Cambridge, Illinois
 KQTR-LP in Purcell, Oklahoma
 KRIT in Parker, Arizona
 KRLL-FM in Circle, Arkansas
 KRLT in South Lake Tahoe, California
  in Raton, New Mexico
 KSAO in San Angelo, Texas
  in Sioux Center, Iowa
  in West Plains, Missouri
  in Fayette, Missouri
  in Mccook, Nebraska
  in Ephrata, Washington
  in Riverton, Wyoming
  in Agana, Guam
 KUBT in Honolulu, Hawaii
 KUQU in Enoch, Utah
 KVHJ-LP in Mission, Texas
 KWDW-LP in Oklahoma City, Oklahoma
 KWSS-LP in Scottsdale, Arizona
 KXDI in Belfield, North Dakota
 KYSL in Frisco, Colorado
 KZBQ in Pocatello, Idaho
  in Dodge City, Kansas
  in Lewiston, Maine
  in Mio, Michigan
 WBKS in Columbus Grove, Ohio
  in Carthage, Illinois
 WDNY-FM in Dansville, New York
  in Sturgeon Bay, Wisconsin
  in Martinez, Georgia
 WDUC in Lynchburg, Tennessee
 WFIJ-LP in Rocky Mount, Virginia
 WGLD-FM in Conway, South Carolina
 WGRM-FM in Greenwood, Mississippi
  in Pearl, Mississippi
  in Saint Marys, Pennsylvania
 WKTG in Madisonville, Kentucky
  in Norwich, New York
 WKYS in Washington, District of Columbia
 WLCL in Sellersburg, Indiana
 WLGM-LP in Edgewater, Florida
  in Chicago, Illinois
 WLQZ-LP in Warsaw, Indiana
  in Morrisville, Vermont
 WLXU-LP in Lexington, Kentucky
  in Marion, Virginia
 WMIA-FM in Miami Beach, Florida
 WMMA-FM in Nekoosa, Wisconsin
  in Moultrie, Georgia
  in Newberry, Michigan
 WNCB in Cary, North Carolina
 WNDX in Lawrence, Indiana
  in New York, New York
 WQMT in Hopewell, Tennessee
  in Union Springs, Alabama
  in Saint Marys, West Virginia
  in Turners Falls, Massachusetts
 WRWK-LP in Midlothian, Virginia
 WSCZ in Winnsboro, South Carolina
 WSEK-FM in Burnside, Kentucky
 WTAX-FM in Sherman, Illinois
 WTBX in Hibbing, Minnesota
  in Fairview, Pennsylvania
 WWGM in Selmer, Tennessee
 WWOD in Woodstock, Vermont
  in Rogersville, Alabama

References 

Lists of radio stations by frequency